The 1902 Buffalo football team represented the University of Buffalo as an independent during in the 1902 college football season. The team had no coach and the team was 3–5–1 overall for the year.

Schedule

References

Buffalo
Buffalo Bulls football seasons
Buffalo football